The Canadian Singles Chart was a chart compiled by the American-based music sales tracking company, Nielsen SoundScan, which began publication in November 1996. It was published every Wednesday and also published on Thursday by Jam!/Canoe. In March, 2006 it was replaced by the Candadian Digital Songs Sales chart, before it was succeeded by the Canadian Hot 100 in 2007.

History
In the 1960s, the Canadian music industry was disparate and regionally focused, and English-speaking Canadian artists were often overlooked in favour of American acts. To encourage a more national focus and ensure that domestic artists were promoted across Canada, the Maple Leaf System (MLS) was set up in 1969. The MLS produced its own national singles chart, which Billboard magazine reproduced as Canada's entry in its weekly Hits of the World section. The MLS struggled to achieve widespread support in Canada, however, particularly as participating radio stations failed to give the nominated Canadian records the requisite national airplay.

In November 1996, Nielsen started compiling sales charts, before that, sales figures were provided by The Record from a sampling of retailers. Originally, when the chart was started in 1996, there were 200 positions (with the top 50 being published by Jam!). However, because of the reduced singles market in Canada, only the top 10 positions appeared on the SoundScan chart (SoundScan had a policy that at least 10 copies had to be sold in order to make its singles chart).

From the early 1990s, single sales in Canada decreased dramatically, and most songs were not available as commercial singles.  As a result, the chart rarely reflected the listening habits of Canadians. In perhaps the most notorious example, Elton John's charity single "Candle in the Wind '97"/"Something About the Way You Look Tonight" stayed in the top twenty for three years. By 2004, sales in Canada declined even further, because of the growing popularity of digital downloading of music. As a result, Canadian sales were not as substantial as they had been before in the 1990s and early 2000s, and singles remained on the chart for even lengthier periods of time. In 2006, most Canadian number-one singles sold less than 200 copies. To improve the growth of digital sales in the region Nielsen Entertainment Canada created the Canadian digital songs sales chart which then replaced the Canadian singles chart starting in March 2006.

Billboard introduced their own singles chart for Canada, called the Canadian Hot 100, on June 7, 2007. It is based on digital download single sales and streaming data from Nielsen SoundScan and radio audience levels from Nielsen BDS.

Other Canadian singles charts

 CHUM Chart - Charted singles starting in 1957
 RPM Magazine – Charted singles from 1964–2000.
 CRIA Top 50 singles (September 1977 to 1980)
 CBC Singles chart (starting 1980)
 Canadian Hot 100 – Charted singles from 2007–present.
 Music Canada Top 20 Tracks

References

Further research
 
 

Canadian record charts